Prince Louis Léopold Charles Marie André Poniatowski (24 January 1864 – 8 March 1954), was a Polish nobleman, member of the House of Poniatowski who became a prominent French financier and industrialist.

Early life
Prince Poniatowski was born in Paris, France on 24 January 1864. He was the youngest son of Prince Stanisław August Poniatowski (1835–1908) and Countess Louise Le Hon (1838–1931). His father served as Master of Horse to Emperor Napoleon III of France. He had an older sister and brother, Prince Charles Poniatowski, who married Maud Ely Goddard of New Brighton (a grand-niece of Mayor Smith Ely Jr.).

His maternal grandparents were Charles de Morny, Duke of Morny and the Countess Le Hon ( Fanny Mosselman; although she was married to Count Charles Le Hon when Louise was born). His paternal grandparents were Prince Józef Michał Poniatowski, a prominent composer and a singer, and Countess Matilda Perotti.

Prince Poniatowski graduated from the French Saumur School of Cavalry.

Career
In pursuit of investment opportunities, Poniatowski went to San Francisco and formed a syndicate to rework old Gold Country mines using modern methods. To facilitate transportation, he backed Thomas S. Bullock in the construction of the Sierra Railway to get to the mines, and financed construction of the Blue Lakes powerhouse on the Mokelumne River to get electric power to the mines. Realizing the vast potential of this river for hydroelectric power, Poniatowski and his brother-in-law, William Henry Crocker, he formed the Standard Electric Co. in 1897 to build Electra Powerhouse (which later merged into the Pacific Gas and Electric Company). In addition to their railway, mining and power interests, Poniatowski and Crocker built Tanforan Racetrack near Sky Farm, his winter residence in Burlingame.

Return to France
In 1904, after fifteen years in California, he sold his interests and returned to France with his family. He became "one of the leading authorities on finance, headed the French Finance Company, formed to float issues of American securities in France, and was head of Banque Privée." 

In World War I, at the age of 52, he served in the French Army as liaison officer with the British Army.

Personal life

On 6 October 1894, Poniatowski married Elizabeth Helen Sperry (1872–1911), an heiress from Stockton, California, in Paris. A daughter of Simon Willard Sperry and Caroline Elizabeth ( Barker) Sperry, her sister, Ethel (née Sperry) Crocker, was the wife of banker William H. Crocker. Together, they were the parents of at least five sons, including:

 Prince Stanisław August Poniatowski (1895–1970), who married Aglaë de Sainte-Aldegonde, a daughter of Edmond André de Sainte-Aldegonde and Marthe Marie des Acres de L'Aigle.
 Prince Charles Poniatowski (1897–1980), who married Countess Anne de Caraman-Chimay, a daughter of Pierre Marie de-Riquet-de-Caraman-Chimay and Marthe Mathilde Barbe Werlé, in 1920.
 Prince André John Poniatowski (1899–1977), who married American heiress Frances Alice Willing Lawrance, a daughter of Francis Cooper Lawrance Jr. and Susan Ridgway (née Willing) Lawrance and cousin to Vincent Astor and Ava Alice Muriel Astor (through Alice's maternal aunt, Ava Lowle Willing). 
 Prince Jean Joseph Évremond Sperry Poniatowski (1907–1978), who married French-born Mexican heiress María Dolores Paulette Amor de Yturbe.

In June 1911, the Princess attended the coronation of King George V in London with her sister. She died in Paris only two months later in August 1911, at only 39 years old. Poniatowski died on 8 March 1954 in Cahors, France.

Descendants
Through his son Charles, he was a grandfather of French politician Michel Poniatowski (1922–2002), who served as Minister of State and Minister of the Interior under his longtime friend, President Valéry Giscard d'Estaing (after having previously served as Minister of Health under President Georges Pompidou).

Through his youngest son Jean, he was a grandfather of writer Elena Poniatowska (b. 1932), who married Mexican astronomer Guillermo Haro.

References

External links

 Home of Prince Poniatowski, Burlingame, Cal.
 1922 Press Photo Prince Andre Poniatowski & Princess Elizabeth To Visit Californ
 Portrait of Princess Poniatowski by Jacques Émile Blanche

1864 births
1954 deaths
Nobility from Florence
French people of Polish descent
André